Union Township is one of twelve townships in Hendricks County, Indiana, United States. As of the 2010 census, its population was 1,856.

Geography

Cities and towns
 Lizton

Unincorporated towns
 Montclair
 Raintown
(This list is based on USGS data and may include former settlements.)

Adjacent townships
 Harrison Township, Boone County (northeast)
 Middle Township (east)
 Center Township (south)
 Eel River Township (west)
 Jackson Township, Boone County (northwest)

Cemeteries
The township contains nine cemeteries: Burgess, Cundiff, Groover, Leach Number 1, Leach Number 2, Lizton K of P, Montgomery, Pritchett and Vieley.

Major highways
  Interstate 74
  U.S. Route 136
  Indiana State Road 39

References
 U.S. Board on Geographic Names (GNIS)
 United States Census Bureau cartographic boundary files

External links

Townships in Hendricks County, Indiana
Townships in Indiana